Henri Gaudin (25 September 1933 – 5 March 2021) was a French architect.

Early life
Henri Gaudin was born on 25 September 1933 in Paris, and he grew up in La Rochelle. Paul Arzens was his cousin.

Gaudin graduated from the École des Beaux-Arts.

Career
Gaudin designed the nursery and primary schools in Souppes-sur-Loing with Charles Maj in 1970. In 1980, he designed buildings in Maurepas and Saint-Quentin-en-Yvelines.

With his son Bruno, Gaudin renovated the Stade Sébastien Charléty in Paris. They also redesigned the Guimet Museum in 2001.

Gaudin became a professor of architecture at the École nationale supérieure d'architecture de Versailles in 1987.

Gaudin turned down the Grand prix national de l'architecture in 1988. However, he accepted the 1994 Prix de l'Équerre d'Argent, which he was awarded with his son Bruno for their design of the Stade Sébastien Charléty.

Personal life
Gaudin resided in Belleville, Paris.

He died on 5 March 2021 at the age of 87.

Works
La cabane et le labyrinthe (éditions Mardaga, 1984)
Seuil et d'ailleurs (éditions du demi-cercle, 1992)
Naissance d'une forme (éditions Norma, 2001)
Considérations sur l'espace (éditions du Rocher, 2003)
Hors les murs (éditions Nicolas Chaudun, 2012)

References

2021 deaths
1933 births
Architects from Paris
École des Beaux-Arts alumni
20th-century French architects
21st-century French architects